The  (Angelic Mass) is a mass composed by Józef Świder in 1998. He scored it for soprano or tenor solo, a four-part choir, string orchestra and percussion. He also wrote a version for women's choir and keyboard instrument (piano or organ). It was published by Carus-Verlag in 2009.

Świder is a Polish composer whose sacred music is popular in his home country and abroad. The title Missa angelica is often used for a mass connected to the annunciation by the archangel Gabriel. Świder set the complete liturgical text of the Mass Ordinary, and even the final "Ite missa est" with an added Alleluja.

Structure 
Świder structured the text in seven movements, which he marked for tempo in Italian:
 Kyrie – Lento cantabile
 Gloria – Allegretto vigoroso
 Credo – Maestose, con moto
 Sanctus – Maestoso
 Benedictus – Adagio cantabile
 Agnus Dei – Lento
 Ite missa est – Allegretto vigoroso

The duration is given as 24 minutes.

References

External links 
 Missa angelica : Orchesterfassung per soprano (tenore) solo, coro SATB, 2 violini, viola, violoncello, contrabbasso, timpani, batteria (campane, marimba, piatti, tamburo, tamtam, triangolo) WorldCat

Masses (music)
1998 compositions